Hay Street, Kalgoorlie was a notorious red light area in Kalgoorlie, Western Australia for most of the history of Kalgoorlie.

The prevalence of the brothels was part of the law and order issue of an isolated mining town, where two-up, prostitution and gold stealing were all regularly reported forms of criminality.

The street and its associations would regularly be reported in mainstream media.

Towards the end of the twentieth century the prostitution was less infamous, and photographs and stories were more public than in earlier times.

Regulation and prohibition of the prostitution in the street have been publicly discussed a number of times by the local government and citizens of Kalgoorlie.

 one brothel remained open.

The street, closer to the town centre, has a number of important administration buildings, and respectable businesses.

Notes

Roads in Kalgoorlie-Boulder
Red-light districts in Australia